The Kurunegala Municipal Council (Sinhala: කුරුණෑගල මහ නගර සභා Kurunegala Maha Nagara Sabha) is the local council for Kurunegala, the capital city of North Western Province, Sri Lanka.
The Municipal Council provides sewer, road management and waste management services, in case of water, electricity and telephone utility services the council liaises with the Water Supply and Drainage Board, the Ceylon Electricity Board and telephone service providers.

Representation 
The Kurunegala Municipal Council is divided into 13 wards and is represented by 21 councillors, elected using an open list proportional representation system. Wards those belong to the Kurunegala Municipal Council are listed below.

Gangoda
Wewa
Central
Yanthampalawa
Illuppugedara
Madamegama
Wehera
Udawalpola
Bazzar
Gettuwana
Polaththapitiya
Teliyagonna (Upper)
Teliyagonna (Lower)

2018 Local government election 
Results of the local government election held on 10 February 2018.

References

External links 
Public library - Kurunegala Municipal Council

Municipal councils of Sri Lanka
Kurunegala